Stephen Michael Jepson was born May 31, 1941 in Sioux City, Iowa. After receiving his MFA from Alfred University in 1971, he went on to open his studio in Geneva, Florida, and began the ceramics department at the University of Central Florida, where he taught for eight years. In 1976, Jepson jar with lid was selected to be included in the Smithsonian Museum Collection of American Crafts. In 1978, Jepson was profiled in The Professional Potter by Thomas Shafer. In 1993, he founded the video production company, Thoughtful Productions. His instructional videos are intended to teach intermediate and beginner potters how to improve their technique. In 1997, Jepson founded The World Pottery Institute in Geneva, Florida, a school for potters. While Jepson continues to teach pottery, he is now retired and has dedicated himself to athletic inventions.

Background

Training
Bachelor of Science Degree at Truman University 1969
Master of Fine Arts Degree from Alfred University 1971

Teaching experience
Valencia Community College, Orlando, Florida
University of Central Florida, Orlando, Florida

Workshops and seminars
Wooster College, Wooster, Ohio
Miami Ceramic League – Workshop, one man exhibit, judged the members show, Arrowmont School of Crafts
Santa Fe Community College, Gainesville, Florida
National Council for Education in Ceramic Art (panel chair)
World Pottery Institute founded in 1997

One-man, group and competitive shows

The American Hand, Washington, D.C.
Functional Ceramics, Wooster, Ohio
Indianapolis Museum, Indianapolis, Indiana
Wichita National
Crafts National
National Teapot Invitational
Cedar Creek Gallery Invitational
National Pitcher Invitational, West Virginia University
University of Central Florida Invitational
Complex Gallery, Knoxville, Tennessee

Awards at art festivals
Winter Park Art Festival, Winter Park, Florida
Las Olas Boulevard Art Festival, For Lauderdale, Florida
Coconut Grove Art Festival, Coconut Grove, Florida
Ringling Museum Art Festival, Sarasota, Florida
Ormond Beach Art Festival, Ormond Beach, Florida
Gasparilla Art Festival, Tampa, Florida
DeLand Art Festival, DeLand, Florida
Virginia Beach Art Festival, Virginia Beach, Virginia

Thoughtful Productions
In 1993, Stephen Jepson founded the video production company, Thoughtful Productions, to produce instructional videos about making pottery.

World Pottery Institute
Jepson created the World Pottery Institute in 1997. Located in Geneva, Florida, The World Pottery Institute is a school for potters ranging from beginners to professionals.

Never Leave The Playground
Jepson created, and maintains the website http://neverleavetheplayground.com, which has a mission statement of:

"My Never Leave The Playground© is a program of activities that stimulates the growth of the brain and body by specific training of the hands and feet. My method has two main goals: to promote good health and to have fun.

People believe exercise is strenuous but my method is neither arduous nor boring. Instead, I focus on movements and games, many similar to those children play on the playground. I begin with simple movements, which progress to more complex challenges for the brain and body. For example, I train left and right, hands and feet, to manipulate large and small objects with increasing precision. The movements I teach promote balance and dexterity which prevent falls and increase eye–hand coordination. The activities in the method develop the large and small muscle groups and foster stability and physical coordination.

Every cell in the body is affected by movement. The brain improves as we use our muscles, which, in turn grow, with use. Scientific studies show that physical movement is the single most important thing to do to be physically healthier and smarter, regardless of age. Movement training can prevent or delay the onset of Alzheimer's and dementia.  Neural pathways open and increase throughout our lives as we learn new activities."

References

Living people
1941 births
American potters